Kauwboy is a 2012 Dutch drama film directed by Boudewijn Koole. The film was selected as the Dutch entry for the Best Foreign Language Oscar at the 85th Academy Awards, but it did not make the final shortlist.

Cast
 Rick Lens as Jojo
 Loek Peters as Ronald
 Cahit Ölmez as Deniz
 Susan Radder as Yenthe
 Ricky Koole as July

Awards
 Golden Elephant Award - 18th International Children's Film Festival held at Hyderabad, India in 2013
 Grand Prix of the Deutsches Kinderhilfswerk - Berlin International Film Festival (Berlinale) 2012
 Best Music - Dutch Film Festival 2012
 Critics Choice - Dutch Film Festival 2012
 European Discovery 2012 - European Film Awards 2012
 Rick Lens nominated as Best Young Actor in an International Feature Film - Young Artist Awards 2013

See also
 List of submissions to the 85th Academy Awards for Best Foreign Language Film
 List of Dutch submissions for the Academy Award for Best Foreign Language Film

References

External links
 

2012 films
2012 drama films
Dutch drama films
2010s Dutch-language films
European Film Awards winners (films)
Films directed by Boudewijn Koole